Georgina García Pérez and Oksana Kalashnikova were the defending champions but chose not to participate.

Anna Danilina and Ulrikke Eikeri won the title, defeating Dalma Gálfi and Kimberley Zimmermann in the final, 6–0, 1–6, [10–4].

Seeds

Draw

Draw

References
Main Draw

Grand Est Open 88 - Doubles